BCAA may refer to:

 Branched-chain amino acid
 Belgian Civil Aviation Authority
 Bermuda Civil Aviation Authority
 British Columbia Automobile Association